Guarapari is a coastal town of Espírito Santo, Brazil, a popular tourist destination. Its beach is famous for the high natural radioactivity level of its sand.

Geography

Location
Guarapari is a part of Greater Vitoria, 47 km south of the state capital Vitória. Its population is 126,701 (2020) and its area is 592 km².
It is a well-known tourist destination, known for its curving white sand beaches backed by commercial development, which extend southward to Nova Guarapari and Meaípe. With its heavily built-up coastline like Vila Velha and Vitória, it caters heavily to seasonal tourists, and consequently has quite a dramatic seasonal population fluctuation.

The municipality contains the  Concha d'Ostra Sustainable Development Reserve, established in 2003 to protect the mangroves of the Bay of Guarapari. It also contains the  Paulo César Vinha State Park, which protects an area of dunes, lagoons and marshes along the Atlantic shore. Formerly called the Setiba nature reserve, it is a pristine example of a coastal ecosystem and important for local turtle and bird populations.

History
The municipality has had European presence since 1585 when Jesuit missionaries built a small chapel and dug a well.

Transportation
The city is served by Guarapari Airport.

Radioactivity

Along a roughly 500-mile portion of Brazil's Atlantic coast that runs from north of Rio de Janeiro up to the region south of Bahia, the sands of old beaches are naturally radioactive. Sea waves pound coastal mountains rich in monazite, a phosphate of rare earth metals containing uranium and thorium. The background radiation level on some spots on the Guarapari beach read 175 mSv per year (20μSv/h); Some other spots can reach dosages of up to 55 μSv/h. To place that in context, the average exposure level across the United States is ~0.34 μSv/hour while a chest x-ray is a one time exposure of 0.1 mSv, and an abdominal and pelvic CT scan with and without contrast is 20-30 mSv.

In the Guarapari city, radiation levels are far lower: a study among 320 inhabitants showed an average received dose of 0.6 µSv/h, corresponding to 5.2 mSv per year.

References

External links

Guiacapixaba.net: Guarapari
Webcitation.org: Guarapari Info—
Guarapari.tiosam.org: Guarapari — history and travel tips—
Agrogemeos.com: Google Map images of Guarapari 

Municipalities in Espírito Santo
Populated coastal places in Espírito Santo